Children of Chance is a 1949 British drama film directed by Luigi Zampa and starring Patricia Medina, Yvonne Mitchell and Manning Whiley.

It was shot on location in Ischia at the same time as an Italian version Alarm Bells, also directed by Zampa but with a different cast. Michael Medwin adapted the original Italian screenplay for the English version.

Synopsis
Agostina has made some money in the black market of Rome during the Second World War and sent it back to her hometown priest for safekeeping. However, returning to the island intending to recover the money, she finds that the priest has died and his successor has used it to build an orphanage.

Cast
 Patricia Medina as Agostina
 Manning Whiley as Don Andrea
 Yvonne Mitchell as Australia
 Barbara Everest as Francesca
 Eliot Makeham as Vicar
 George Woodbridge as Butcher
 Frank Tickle as Mayor
 Eric Pohlmann as Sergeant
 Edward Lexy as Doctor
 Carlo Giustini as Marco

See also
 Alarm Bells (1949)

References

External links

1949 films
1949 drama films
1940s multilingual films
British drama films
British black-and-white films
British multilingual films
1940s English-language films
Films directed by Luigi Zampa
Lux Film films
British Lion Films films
1940s British films